Selfors is a village in the municipality of Rana in Nordland county, Norway.  Selfors sits on the northern shore of the river Ranelva and it is a northeastern suburb of the town of Mo i Rana.  The European route E06 highway passes through the village. Selfors has been inhabited since the Iron Age.

The local branch of the Helgeland Hospital in Rana, is located on Selfors. There are also two daycare centres, a primary school, and school with secondary classes. In connection with the expansion of the Norsk Jernverk iron and metal industry company in 1946, Selfors Church was originally built by the Catholic Church. It was built in 1971 and constructed mainly out of glass and wood. It seats 200. Since 1976, however, it has also been used by the Church of Norway.

Additionally, Selfors has a grocery store (which includes the local post office); a flower shop; a store for hunting, fishing and outdoor life; a petrol station; and an inn located along European route E06.  There are six housing cooperatives in Selfors, owned by Mo og Omegn Boligbyggelag.

Transportation
The Selfors Bridge over the Ranelva river on the E6 highway connects Selfors with the town of Mo i Rana. The first bridge at Selfors was built in 1914. On 18 May 1940, it was blown up by the resistance in order to slow down the northward advance of the German occupation forces. It was, however, quickly rebuilt, and was used until it was torn down on 17 March 1965. A new bridge was then built, and is still in use today.

Before the opening of the new bridge between Mjølan and Ytteren, Selfors Bridge was the only road connection between Mo i Rana and the two urban districts Ytteren and Båsmoen.

The hillsides and mountains at Selfors are a popular terrain for outdoor activities. Varmosletta, Skarvatnet, and Kvitbergan ("the white cliffs") are located in untouched nature.

History

Selfors farm
Selfors farm is one of the oldest farms in Nord-Rana and it played a central role at that place until 1680. The farm was located along the river Ranelva on the western parts of the present-day village of Selfors, near the Ranfjorden and Fossetangen.

Selfors farm is mentioned in "the farm book of Aslak Bolt" in 1430, written by Aslak Harniktsson Bolt (ca.1380−1449), the Archbishop of Nidaros. Aslak Bolt wrote: "af selfosse 1/2 spann" Selfors thus paid 1/2 bucket of butter to the Archbishop of the Diocese of Nidaros.

The Leidang census during the years 1566−1567 does not mention the farm. It had probably not ceased to exist, but was rather forgotten, since the farmer during the census in 1610 was registered as a sailor and in 1612 as a bailiff.  In the 17th century Selfors farm belonged to the Hemnes Church parish.

Name
The name Selfors was first mentioned in 1430. It has been interpreted as Sel-foss (Norwegian for "the pinniped waterfall"), meaning a waterfall where pinnipeds lived. It also has been connected with the Sami word saelhtie, meaning "ocean".  This interpretation of "Sel-foss", however, is doubtful. In the old dialect of Rana they never used the name "sel" for pinnipeds, but rather used "købbe". Købbforsen which literally means "the pinniped waterfall", is located in another place in Rana municipality.  The name could also be seen in connection with sele ("silent flowing and deep water"), similar to  the Swedish place names of Lycksele, Sorsele, and Åsele. Selfors may then mean "a waterfall in a river with silent flowing, deep water". The waterfall is located at Fossetangen, and the "silent flowing, deep water" might be to river Ranelva.

Media gallery

Kvitbergan
Photos from the mountains around Selfors, taken in November 2005:

References

Rana, Norway
Villages in Nordland